The Nightingale and the Rose is a ballet choreographed by Christopher Wheeldon to music by Bright Sheng commissioned by the New York City Ballet. The premiere took place on Friday, June 8, 2007, at the New York State Theater, Lincoln Center, the orchestra conducted by the composer. Its libretto is based on the short story of the same name by Oscar Wilde.

Original cast 

Wendy Whelan
Sara Mearns
Tyler Angle

References 
Playbill, New York City Ballet, Thursday, February 14, 2008
Repertory Week, New York City Ballet, Winter Season, 2008 repertory, week 7

Reviews 
NY Times review by Jennifer Dunning, June 11, 2007
NY Times review by Alastair Macaulay, February 16, 2008

Ballets by Christopher Wheeldon
New York City Ballet repertory
Ballets by Bright Sheng
2007 ballet premieres
Adaptations of works by Oscar Wilde